Eamon Donnelly (19 July 1877 – 29 December 1944) was an Irish politician.

He was born in Middletown, County Armagh, the son of Francis Donnelly, a mason, and Catherine Donnelly (née Haggin). He was a member of the Irish Volunteers. In 1921 he joined Éamon de Valera's anti-treaty forces and remained a critic of partition until his death. He was interned and on his release was appointed Chief Organiser of Sinn Féin.

While living in Newry, Donnelly was elected as an abstentionist Independent Republican member of the Parliament of Northern Ireland for the Armagh constituency at the 1925 general election. Shortly after his election, he was served with an order excluding him from Northern Ireland. No official reason was given for the granting of this order.

In 1926, he became a founder member of Fianna Fáil. Donnelly was elected to Dáil Éireann as a Fianna Fáil Teachta Dála (TD) for the Leix–Offaly constituency at the 1933 general election. He did not contest the 1937 general election.  He also served as Director of Elections for Fianna Fáil.

In 1938, Donnelly visited his wife's house near Newry, and was imprisoned in Belfast Prison, before being given a choice between paying a fine of £25 or returning to prison. Again, no reason for his imprisonment and exclusion was revealed. That year, he stood for election to the 2nd Seanad, but was not successful.

In 1942, Donnelly was again elected to the Parliament of Northern Ireland, this time in a by-election for Belfast Falls. He did not take his seat. He died on 29 December 1944.

References

1877 births
1944 deaths
Fianna Fáil TDs
Members of the 8th Dáil
Members of the House of Commons of Northern Ireland 1925–1929
Members of the House of Commons of Northern Ireland 1938–1945
Members of the House of Commons of Northern Ireland for County Armagh constituencies
Members of the House of Commons of Northern Ireland for Belfast constituencies
Politicians from County Armagh